Schlierbach may refer to:

 Schlierbach (Göppingen), a community in the district of Göppingen, Baden-Württemberg, Germany
 Schlierbach, Haut-Rhin, commune in France
 Heidelberg-Schlierbach, a district of the city of Heidelberg, Baden-Württemberg, Germany
 , a district of Schaafheim,  Darmstadt-Dieburg, Hesse
 Schlierbach, Switzerland, a municipality in the canton of Lucerne
 Schlierbach, Austria, a municipality in Upper Austria
 Schlierbach Abbey, a monastery in Upper Austria